955 Alstede is a minor planet orbiting the Sun.

It was discovered by Karl Wilhelm Reinmuth in 1921 and was named after his wife Lina Alstede Reinmuth, who also had 954 Li named after her.

References

External links 
 
 

000955
Discoveries by Karl Wilhelm Reinmuth
Named minor planets
19210805